Rosburg is a Census-designated place (CDP) in Wahkiakum County, Washington, United States. Rosburg has a post office with ZIP code 98643. The CDP includes the communities of Eden and Oneida.

Christian Rosburg, the town's first postmaster, named Rosburg for himself.

References

Census-designated places in Wahkiakum County, Washington
Census-designated places in Washington (state)